Hannie Singer-Dekker  (1 October 1917, The Hague – 4 April 2007, Haren (Groningen)) was a Dutch politician.

References
Mr. H. (Hannie) Singer-Dekker at www.parlement.com

1917 births
2007 deaths
Dutch legal scholars
Labour Party (Netherlands) politicians
Members of the House of Representatives (Netherlands)
Politicians from The Hague
Leiden University alumni
Radboud University Nijmegen alumni
Academic staff of the University of Groningen